SYNE International Film Festival  (SIFF)  is an annual film festival at Muvattupuzha, Ernakulam(Cochin) in Kerala, India. SYNE International Film Festival was first conducted in 2001 May. The First Film festival was started with the film The Cup from Tibet. The festival was conducted by SYNE featured 20 films during 4 days at Muvattupuzha, 35 kilometers away from Cochin in Kerala.

The festival also offered filmmaker workshops, industry seminars, discussion forums, and outreach activities that include screenings in rural and urban areas where international cinemas access are non-existent. The second film festival was on 2002, which was conducted by SYNE in association with Muvattupuzha Press Club. The festival screened its first movie in the Muvattupuzha Municipal Park for 800+ Public film supporters. The festival featured 16 Films categorizing Family & Love as the main theme. The festival was inaugurated by Priyanandan, young film director in Malayalam language.

The third Film Festival was at Perumbalam in 2003, an Island in Alleppy in association with a regional arts community. The festival initiated with the film No Mans Land, featuring the war in between Bosnia and Serbia. The festival featured 16 films including short films and documentaries.

The fourth film festival theme was War & Peace, conducted at Muvattupuzha in 2005 May. The film festival was dedicated to Twelve-year-old Ali Ismail Abbas of Iraq who suffered 60% burns in the attack which destroyed his Baghdad home and killed his family. Ali lost two hands and legs in the Second Gulf War. The inaugural film was Khantahar by Mohesin Makmalbaf. The festival also featured the documentary Godse.

In 2005, SYNE conducted Touring Talkies - Film festival along with Kerala State Chalachitra Academy at Muvattupuzha. The festival featured 18 films and exhibited the 100 years of Malayalam and Indian Cinema.

External links
  Kerala State Chalachitra Academy
  Ali Ismail Abbas, Iraq

Film festivals in Kerala
Festivals in Ernakulam district